Zardanjan (also Romanized as Zardanjān and Zardenjan; also known as Zardanjān Jey) is a village in Jey Rural District, in the Central District of Isfahan County, Isfahan Province, Iran. At the 2006 census, its population was 697, in 188 families.

References 

Populated places in Isfahan County